The Valdarno is the valley of the river Arno, although this name does not apply to the entire river basin. Usage of the term generally excludes Casentino and the valleys formed by major tributaries.

Some towns in the area:
Rignano sull'Arno
Figline e Incisa Valdarno
San Giovanni Valdarno
Montevarchi
Terranuova Bracciolini
Reggello
Castelfranco Piandiscò

Valleys of Tuscany